Louis Cosyns (born 29 September 1952 in Saint-Amand-Montrond) was a member of the National Assembly of France.  He represented Cher's 3rd constituency from 2002 to 2012, as a member of the Union for a Popular Movement.

References

1952 births
Living people
People from Cher (department)
Politicians from Centre-Val de Loire
Rally for the Republic politicians
Union for a Popular Movement politicians
The Republicans (France) politicians
Deputies of the 12th National Assembly of the French Fifth Republic
Deputies of the 13th National Assembly of the French Fifth Republic